Pina Cipriotto (14 March 1911 – 30 July 1986) was an Italian gymnast. She competed in the women's artistic team all-around event at the 1936 Summer Olympics.

References

External links
 

1911 births
1986 deaths
Italian female artistic gymnasts
Olympic gymnasts of Italy
Gymnasts at the 1936 Summer Olympics
Sportspeople from Trieste